Lawrence Kapiloff (September 22, 1929 - January 12, 2019) was an American politician. He served in the California State Assembly from 1973 to 1982, as a Democrat for the 78th district. He was born in Brooklyn, New York.

References

2019 deaths
1929 births
Democratic Party members of the California State Assembly
20th-century American politicians